The 2012 AFC Cup Final was a football match which was played on 3 November 2012, to determine the champion of the 2012 AFC Cup. It was the final of the 8th edition of the AFC Cup, a competition organized by the Asian Football Confederation (AFC) for clubs from "developing countries" in Asia.

The final was played between Arbil from Iraq and Al-Kuwait from Kuwait. It was the first continental final to be hosted in Iraq since the first leg of the 1989 Asian Club Championship Final. Al-Kuwait won 4–0 to win their second AFC Cup title in four years.

Venue
The AFC decided that the final would be hosted by one of the finalists. On 14 June 2012, the draw for the quarter-finals, semi-finals and final was made. For the final, the winner of semi-final 2 (played between the winners of quarter-finals 3 and 4) would be the home team, while the winner of semi-final 1 (played between the winners of quarter-finals 1 and 2) would be the away team. As a result, Arbil are the home team, and Al-Kuwait are the away team.

The match was played at Arbil's home stadium, Franso Hariri Stadium, at Arbil, Iraq.

Road to final

Match details

References

External links
 

Final
AFC Cup finals
Kuwait SC matches